Sport is a significant aspect of the Sydney lifestyle. Activities range from the occasional international event, annual competitions, competitive leagues and individual recreational pursuits.  Sydney is the home of Australia's biggest sports league, the National Rugby League, hosting 16 teams, and the base for a number of teams in national competitions including the Sydney Roosters, Canterbury Bulldogs and Penrith Panthers.

The Sydney City Council caters for sporting activities with a range of facilities. Across the city there are multiple stadiums, many kilometres of dedicated bikeways, ovals and other sports venues. Stadium Australia and the Sydney Cricket Ground, are two of the largest venues in the city.

Sports by Popularity

Rugby League 
Rugby League is the most popular winter spectator sport in Sydney. The National Rugby League has eight teams based in the city as well as playing the NRL Grand Final in Sydney. The city was where the league was founded in 1908 as the New South Wales Rugby League, and the New South Wales rugby league team, which plays in the world's largest attended sporting competition, State of Origin, is based in Sydney. The average attendance ranges from 18,000 to 12,000 across the clubs in Sydney, whilst State of Origin and the Grand Final regularly attract 80,000 people.

Rugby Union 
Rugby Union was the dominant winter sport from the 1870s until the establishment of Rugby league. The Shute Shield is the local competition which was the highest tier of football until the 1990s when the professional Super Rugby competition began. The New South Wales Waratahs are the state's Super Rugby franchise.

Stats and Teams
Rugby league is the most popular spectator sport in Sydney. In 2006,  565,898 people attended first class rugby league matches at Stadium Australia alone. Other popular spectator sports include Cricket, Football (soccer), Australian rules football, rugby union and basketball. The martial arts are also popular in Sydney, with the more traditional western combative disciplines and also because of the proximity to Asian countries where the arts are historically based. While participation rates are high it tends not to enjoy the profile of traditional Australia sports, though the olympic sports of boxing, judo and taekwondo are more well known. For the Asian arts there are many places to practice in Sydney.

Teams in national competitions
 
MacArthur Bulls FC  A League Campbelltown Stadium

Venues

Venues in national competitions

Sydney Olympic Park

Sydney Olympic Park is roughly in the geographical centre of Sydney. Created for the 2000 Olympics, it is now a major sporting centre in the city.

Sydney Superdome
Sydney Superdome hosts miscellaneous events as Sydney's premier indoors facility. It has a maximum capacity of 21,000.

Stadium Australia

Stadium Australia, sponsored as Accor Stadium, is Sydney's largest stadium. Built for the 2000 Olympics, it now hosts big events such as the NRL Grand Final, the rugby league State of Origin and rugby union and soccer internationals.

The venue is the home ground of NRL teams, the Canterbury-Bankstown Bulldogs and the South Sydney Rabbitohs and serves as an occasional home ground for the Parramatta Eels. Accor Stadium also hosts a number of Swans home games and the occasional domestic cricket one-day match.

Other facilities
There are various other sporting and recreational facilities in the centre including another indoor arena, tennis centre, aquatic centre, athletics centre, hockey centre, archery centre, as well as the Sydney Showground. In 2009 the area hosted a motor race in the form of the Sydney 500 motor race to be held on a street circuit within the former Olympic grounds.

Moore Park

Sydney Football Stadium
Sydney Football Stadium (1988) was designed for the use of rugby league and is also used for rugby union and soccer. The Sydney Roosters, the NSW Waratahs and Sydney FC soccer team used it as their home ground. The Wests Tigers used the stadium part-time as a home ground. The ground hosted the 2005–06 A-League grand final won by Sydney FC. The ground also hosted rugby league grand finals from its construction until Stadium Australia was opened. It was demolished in 2019 to make way for the Sydney Football Stadium (2022).

Sydney Cricket Ground

The Sydney Cricket Ground is mainly used for cricket games and Aussie rules matches. It is home to the Sydney Swans and NSW Blues. The ground held over 1,000 rugby league first-grade matches in its history but since the opening of the Sydney Football Stadium is now rarely used.

See also

Sport in New South Wales
Sport in Brisbane
Sports on the Gold Coast, Queensland

References

 
Sport in New South Wales